Joseph Thomas Del Pesco is a contemporary art curator and arts writer. He is currently the International Director of Kadist.

Biography 
He holds a 2005 Masters of Arts degree in Curatorial Practice from the California College of the Arts.

He was co-founder of The Waiting Room with Jay Heikes and Jen Murphy in Minneapolis and was program director at the Soap Factory in 2002, and assistant curator of the Nelson Gallery at UC Davis.

In 2006 he was awarded a curatorial residency at the Banff Centre. Along with artist Scott Oliver, del Pesco founded the San Francisco Bay Area-based Shotgun Review, which was later taken over by Patricia Maloney and developed into Art Practical. The Shotgun Review was part of a larger exhibition project at the Yerba Buena Center for the Arts called the Collective Foundation, a "research and development organization offering services to artists and arts organizations".

Del Pesco is currently the Director of the Kadist Art Foundation in San Francisco, and previously worked as adjunct curator for Artists Space in New York City. He has curated exhibitions at Yerba Buena Center for the Arts, Berkeley Art Museum and Pacific Film Archive, the Nelson Gallery and Fine Arts Collection at the University of California, Davis with curator Renny Pritikin, the San Francisco Museum of Modern Art, and the de Young Art Center.

In 2009 he organized an experimental school-without-walls called the Pickpocket Almanack with the San Francisco Museum of Modern Art. As an artist, del Pesco was chosen to participate in the Renaissance Society's 2002 group show, Watery, Domestic. and was the recipient of a Jerome Foundation Fellowship.

Publications
Del Pesco has had his writing published in Flash Art, Manifesta Journal, Fillip, X-Tra, Proximity, NERO, Mousse, and TENbyTEN Magazines.
In 2018, his book of short stories "The Museum Took a Few Minutes to Collect Itself" was published by Art Metropole (Toronto, Canada).

External links
Official Website
SFMOMA Blog
The Collective Foundation
Interview with Fillip

References

American art curators
California College of the Arts alumni
1975 births
Living people